Duke Gondulf, was also known as Gundulf. He is thought to have been a patrician of Provence who later became Bishop of Metz in the year 591. There is some evidence that he was only a chorbishop. He was the son of the Senator Florentinus (born 485) and Artemia, the daughter of St. Rusticus.

Sources

 Christian Settipani, Les ancêtres de Charlemagne, 1989.
Gregory of Tours, The History of the Franks.

Bishops of Metz
6th-century Frankish bishops
591